The Baghdad Hotel is a large hotel in Baghdad, Iraq, favored by Westerners after the 2003 invasion of Iraq. The hotel overlooks the Tigris on its eastern bank.

History 
The Baghdad Hotel Bombing Terror Attack occurred on October 12, 2003, when a car rigged with a bomb drove past a checkpoint near the hotel. It drove down a side street before it was fired on by guards and exploded, killing the suicide bomber and six Iraqis. Thirty-two other people were wounded, including three U.S. soldiers. Security officials said that concrete barriers absorbed much of the blast, and prevented the car from destroying the hotel. Western journalists, workers, and American and Iraqi members of the Iraqi Governing Council frequently stayed at the hotel.

External links
 US defiant after Baghdad attack
Suicide bombing near hotel kills six Iraqis

Hotels in Iraq
Buildings and structures in Baghdad
Organizations based in Baghdad
Terrorist incidents in Iraq in 2003